Juan Croucier (born August 22, 1959) is a Cuban-born American musician. He is best known as the bassist for the hard rock/glam metal band Ratt.

Career 
Croucier attended Torrance High School in Torrance, California, and played in various bands. He began playing original songs in his bands, and joined a band called Spike by age 16 that was strictly playing originals.  In 1977 he started a new band called FireFoxx along with Ron Abrams on guitar and Bobby Blotzer on drums. Croucier served as bassist for Ratt during the 1980s, and was also very briefly in Quiet Riot and DuBrow. Croucier played with Quiet Riot shortly before Randy Rhoads left to play with Ozzy Osbourne and played with DuBrow in 1981 but did not record with either. Before he left DuBrow he introduced band leader Kevin DuBrow to Frankie Banali. They went on to form a new version of Quiet Riot, resulting in the debut record Metal Health.

Croucier played with Dokken for about four years and toured Germany with the band several times.  He was a member of both Ratt and Dokken simultaneously for approximately 18 months before leaving Dokken. He played and sang backup on Dokken's Breaking the Chains album, and co-wrote two songs. His replacement, Jeff Pilson, appears in the title track video from the album.

With Ratt, Croucier wrote many of the band's biggest hits such as "Lack of Communication" and "You're in Love". His backing vocals also became a trademark part of Ratt's sound.

Croucier went on to own and operate a recording studio in Los Angeles called The Cellar where he recorded, produced and engineered hundreds of records for various bands and solo artists.

Croucier formed a new band Liquid Sunday in 1997, a project based on his solo album of the same name. Croucier sings and also, plays bass and guitar on the album. His brother Rick plays drums on the album as well. Liquid Sunday played on the same bill for one show with Pearcy during the summer of 2006 and later formed a new band called Dirty Rats, consisting of Croucier on bass and lead vocals, Carlos Cavazo on guitar, and John Medina on drums.

On May 12, 2012, Croucier reunited with Ratt and performed with the band at the M3 Rock Festival for the first time since 1991.

Discography

Dokken 
Back in the Streets (1979)
Breaking the Chains (1981)
The Lost Songs: 1978–1981 (2020)

Ratt 
Ratt (1983)
Out of the Cellar (1984)
Invasion of Your Privacy (1985)
Dancing Undercover (1986)
Reach for the Sky (1988)
Detonator (1990)

Solo 
Liquid Sunday (2001)

References

External links 
 
Juan Croucier Interview NAMM Oral History Library (2017)

1959 births
Living people
American entertainers of Cuban descent
American heavy metal bass guitarists
American male bass guitarists
Cuban emigrants to the United States
Dokken members
Glam metal musicians
Ratt members
20th-century American bass guitarists
Torrance High School alumni